The Bundesvision Song Contest 2011 was the seventh edition of the annual Bundesvision Song Contest musical event. The contest was held on 29 September 2011 at the Lanxess Arena in Cologne, North Rhine-Westphalia, following Unheilig's win in the 2010 contest in Berlin with the song "Unter deiner Flagge". This was the second time that North Rhine-Westphalia had hosted the contest, after previously hosting in the first contest Oberhausen in 2005. The contest was hosted by Stefan Raab, Johanna Klum, with Lena Meyer-Landrut; Germany's Eurovision Song Contest 2010 winner, and representative in the Eurovision Song Contest 2011 conducting interviews in the green room, whilst regular green room host Elton sat in the fan block.

The winner of the Bundesvision Song Contest 2011 was Tim Bendzko with the song "Wenn Worte meine Sprache wären", representing Berlin, the state's third win. In second place was  representing Bremen, and third place to Bosse and Anna Loos representing Lower Saxony.

Bundesvision Song Contest 2005 winners Juli returned participating for Hesse, the second time a former winner had returned to the contest after Peter Fox had competed and won in 2009, and before that as a member of Seeed who won in 2006. Other returning artists include
Jennifer Rostock from 2008; again for Mecklenburg-Vorpommern, and Anna Loos representing Lower Saxony; who competed in the band Silly in 2010 for Saxony-Anhalt.

13 of the 16 states awarded themselves the maximum of 12 points, with Brandenburg, Saarland, and Schleswig-Holstein awarding themselves 10, 10, and 3 points respectively.

Results

Scoreboard

References

External links
 Official BSC website at tvtotal.de

2011
Bundesvision Song Contest
2011 song contests